The 2012 Ivan Hlinka Memorial Tournament was an under-18 ice hockey tournament held in Břeclav, Czech Republic, and Piešťany, Slovakia, on August 13–18, 2012. As in the previous two years, the venues were Alcaplast Arena in Břeclav and Patrícia Ice Arena 37 in Piešťany.

Preliminary round

Group A

Group B

Final round

Seventh place game

Fifth place game

Semifinal 1

Semifinal 2

Bronze medal game

Gold medal game

Final standings

See also
2012 IIHF World U18 Championships
2012 World Junior Championships

References

Ivan Hlinka Memorial Tournament
2012
International ice hockey competitions hosted by Slovakia
International ice hockey competitions hosted by the Czech Republic
Ivan
Ivan